George Clymer (1739–1813) was an American politician and founding father.

George Clymer may also refer to:
George E. Clymer (1754?–1834), American engineer and inventor
USS George Clymer (APA-27), a 1941 Arthur Middleton-class attack transport